Events in the year 1858 in Brazil.

Incumbents
Monarch – Pedro II.
Prime Minister – Marquis of Olinda (until 12 December), Viscount of Abaeté (starting 12 December).

Events

Births

Deaths

References

 
1850s in Brazil
Years of the 19th century in Brazil
Brazil
Brazil